Conner Maurer (born February 2, 2002) is an American soccer player who plays as a midfielder for New York Red Bulls II in the USL Championship.

Career

Youth, College and Amateur
Maurer is a member of the New York Red Bulls Academy. During the 2019 USL Championship season he appeared for New York Red Bulls II.

References

External links 
 
 ussoccerda.com profile

2002 births
Living people
American soccer players
New York Red Bulls II players
Association football midfielders
Soccer players from New Jersey
USL Championship players
People from Harrison, New Jersey
Sportspeople from Hudson County, New Jersey